Tangam is an endangered Sino-Tibetan language of the Tani subgroup spoken in Arunachal Pradesh state in North-East India. The total number of Tangam speakers has been alternatively estimated at 150  and 253 . The primary Tangam village is Kuging , which is located at  28°57'22"N  and  94°59'25"E, approximately four hours' walk from Tuting in Upper Siang district. Tangam speakers are also found in some neighbouring villages, as well as in Tuting town.

Most Tangam are hill tribespeople, with a material culture that is similar to that of most Tani peoples of the Siang River valley. However, due to close present and historical contacts with Memba (Bodic-speaking) peoples of Tibet and Arunachal Pradesh, Tangam have also adopted some Tibetan cultural traits.

In the only large-scale work to treat the Tani languages, Sun (1993) had no access to Tangam data and supposed it to be a variety of Damu. Post (2013a) suggested that this was probably not the case, and that Tangam was a distinct Tani language, being mutually-unintelligible to a large extent with any other Tani language. Genealogically, Tangam may align with the Western Tani languages, although it resembles the Eastern Tani languages with which it is in contact to a greater degree.

A comprehensive description of Tangam (grammar, lexicon and texts) was published in 2017.

References

 Lomdak, Lisa, Ed. (2018). The People's Linguistic Survey of India Volume 4: Arunachal Pradesh - Part 2 (English). New Delhi, Orient Blackswan.
 Post, Mark W. (2013a). The Tangam language of Kugɨŋ Təəraŋ. Paper presented at the 46th International Conference of Sino-Tibetan Languages and Linguistics. Hanover, Dartmouth College, Jul 10.
 Post, Mark W. (2013b). Defoliating the Tani Stammbaum: An exercise in areal linguistics. Paper presented at the 13th Himalayan Languages Symposium. Canberra, Australian National University, Aug 9.
 Post, Mark W. (2017). The Tangam Language: Grammar, Lexicon and Texts. Leiden, Brill.
 Sun, Tian-Shin Jackson (1993). A Historical-Comparative Study of the Tani (Mirish) Branch of Tibeto-Burman. PhD Dissertation. Department of Linguistics. Berkeley, University of California.

Tani languages
Languages of Arunachal Pradesh
Upper Siang district